The rum ration (also called the tot) was a daily amount of rum given to sailors on Royal Navy ships. It was abolished in 1970 after concerns that the intake of strong alcohol would lead to unsteady hands when working machinery.

Tradition 
Senior ratings (petty officers and above) received their rum neat, whilst for junior ratings it was diluted with two parts of water to make  of grog. Rum, due to its highly flammable nature, was stored in large barrels in a special rum store in the bowels of the ship. The rum ration was served from one particular barrel, known as the "Rum Tub", which was ornately decorated and was made of oak and reinforced with brass bands with brass letters saying "The Queen, God Bless Her".

Not all sailors necessarily drew their rum: each had the option to be marked in the ship's books as "G" (for Grog) or "T" (for Temperance). Sailors who opted to be "T" were given threepence (3d) a day instead of the rum ration, although most preferred the rum. Sailors under 20 were not permitted a rum ration, and were marked on the ship's books as "UA" (Under Age).

The time when the rum ration was distributed was called "Up Spirits", which was between 11 am and 12 noon.  A common cry from the sailors was "Standfast the Holy Ghost". This was in response to the bosun's call "Up Spirits". Each mess had a "Rum Bosun" who would collect the rum in a metal container called a " fanny " from the Supply rating (Jack Dusty) responsible for measuring out the right number of tots for each mess. The officers did not get a rum ration (but had unrationed access to a range of duty-free commercial spirits).

Tot glasses were kept separate from any other glasses. They were washed on the outside, but never inside, in the belief that residue of past tots would stick to the side of the glass and make the tot even stronger.

History 

A sailor's ration of alcohol was originally beer with a daily ration of one gallon (i.e. eight pints).  This official allowance continued until after the Napoleonic Wars.  When beer was not available, as it would often spoil easily, it could be substituted by a pint of wine or half a pint of spirits depending on what was locally available.  In later years, the political influence of the West Indian planters led to rum being given the preference over arrack and other spirits. The half-pint of spirits was originally issued neat; it is said that sailors would "prove" its strength by checking that gunpowder doused with rum would still burn (thus verifying that rum was at least 57% ABV).

The practice of compulsorily diluting rum in the proportion of half a pint to one quart of water (1:4) was first introduced in the 1740s by Admiral Edward Vernon (known as Old Grog, because of his habitual grogram cloak). The ration was also split into two servings, one between 10 am and noon and the other between 4 and 6 pm. In 1795 Navy regulations required adding small quantities of lemon or lime juice to the ration, to prevent scurvy. The rum itself was often procured from distillers in Jamaica, Trinidad & Tobago and the British Virgin Islands. Rations were cut in half in 1823 and again in half, to the traditional amount, in 1850.

The abolition of the rum ration had been discussed in Parliament in 1850 and again in 1881 however nothing came of it. In 1970, Admiral Peter Hill-Norton abolished the rum ration as he felt it could have led to sailors failing a breathalyser test and being less capable to manage complex machinery. This decision to end the rum ration was made after the Secretary of State for Defence had taken opinions from several ranks of the Navy. Ratings were instead allowed to purchase beer, and the amount allowed was determined, according to the MP David Owen, by the amount of space available for stowing the extra beer in ships. The last rum ration was on 31 July 1970 and became known as Black Tot Day as sailors were unhappy about the loss of the rum ration. There were reports that the day involved sailors throwing tots into the sea and the staging of a mock funeral in a training camp. In place of the rum ration, sailors were allowed to buy three  cans of beer a day and improved recreational facilities. While the rum ration was abolished, the order to "splice the mainbrace", awarding sailors an extra tot of rum for good service, remained as a command which could only be given by the Monarch and is still used to recognise good service. Rum rations are also given on special occasions: in recent years, examples included the 100th anniversary of the Royal Canadian Navy in 2010 and after the Queen's Diamond Jubilee celebrations in 2012.

In other navies 
It was abolished in 1862.

While the Royal Australian Navy never issued the rum ration, their sailors were entitled to the rum ration when they were on Royal Navy ships until 1921.

The Royal Canadian Navy abolished the rum ration in 1972, and the last navy to issue the rum ration regularly, the Royal New Zealand Navy, abolished the practice on 28 February 1990.

See also
Beer day

References 

Royal Navy traditions
Rums
Drinking culture
1970 disestablishments in the United Kingdom
Alcohol and the military